Seth McCoy (December 17, 1928, Sanford, North Carolina - January 22, 1997, Rochester, New York) was an American operatic tenor.

References
Seth McCoy at Oxford Music Online
Obituary, Los Angeles Times
Obituary, New York Times

1928 births
1997 deaths
Musicians from North Carolina
American operatic tenors
20th-century American male opera singers